Rushab Patel (born 29 June 1993) is a Kenyan cricketer. He made his List A debut in the 2015–17 ICC World Cricket League Championship on 28 May 2016 against Papua New Guinea. In January 2018, he was named in Kenya's squad for the 2018 ICC World Cricket League Division Two tournament.

In May 2019, he was named in Kenya's squad for the Regional Finals of the 2018–19 ICC T20 World Cup Africa Qualifier tournament in Uganda. In September 2019, he was named in Kenya's squad for the 2019 ICC T20 World Cup Qualifier tournament in the United Arab Emirates. He made his Twenty20 International (T20I) debut for Kenya, against Bermuda, on 21 October 2019. In November 2019, he was named in Kenya's squad for the Cricket World Cup Challenge League B tournament in Oman.

In October 2021, he was named in Kenya's squad for the Regional Final of the 2021 ICC Men's T20 World Cup Africa Qualifier tournament in Rwanda.

References

External links
 

1993 births
Living people
Kenyan cricketers
Kenya Twenty20 International cricketers
Cricketers from Nairobi